Russia–United States summits are held from 1991 to present.  The topics discussed at the summits between the president of the United States and the president of Russia.

List of summits
List of Soviet Union–United States summits 1943–1991.

See also

 Arms control
 Détente
 Foreign policy of the United States
 Foreign relations of Russia
 List of international trips made by presidents of the United States
 Nuclear disarmament
 Russia–United States relations
 List of Soviet Union–United States summits

References

20th-century diplomatic conferences
21st-century diplomatic conferences
Diplomacy-related lists
Diplomatic visits by heads of government
Diplomatic visits by heads of state
Lists of United States presidential visits
Russia diplomacy-related lists
United States history-related lists
summits
Lists of conferences
Russia history-related lists
United States diplomacy-related lists